The 1722 Algarve earthquake occurred on 27 December 1722. It was felt throughout the Portuguese region of Algarve and destroyed a large area in southern Portugal generating a local tsunami that flooded the shallow areas of Tavira. It is unclear whether its source was located onshore or offshore and, in any case, what was the tectonic source responsible for the event. Some scientific research work has concluded that the 27 December 1722 Algarve earthquake and tsunami was probably generated offshore, close to 37°01′N, 7°49′W. The 1722 earthquake was 33 years before the great earthquake of 1755 which remains a major event in Portuguese history, mainly due to its effects on Lisbon which was wiped out by structural collapse, fire and then the flooding from a tsunami that raced up the Tagus River. Most of the documentation of the 1722 Algarve seismic event was sent to Lisbon for archiving and became lost after the fire that followed the 1755 earthquake. But the few surviving written records of the 1722 earthquake describe a destructive series of events affecting several Algarvean localities with earth tremors so strong that they made the bells ring out in Tavira, Faro and Loulé. In Tavira a caravel moored on the river Gilão was left high and dry before the tsunami hit with the dumbfounded crew able to walk to shore. The magnitude is estimated to have been 7.8 on the Richter scale. The earthquake of 1722 was probably caused by a diapirism where dense rock from deeper levels under high pressure pierced shallower materials. As a result, buildings in Albufeira, Faro, Lagoa and Loulé were also severely damaged or, in some cases, destroyed. In the 2010s, studies of seismic risk estimated there would be around 12,000 deaths if an earthquake equal to that of 1722 occurred then during peak season, because population density was significantly higher in the coastal areas of Algarve in the early 21st century, when it had already become a popular international travel destination, than in the 18th century, and construction of high-rise buildings built without proper anti-seismic measures were pervasive in the decades preceding such studies.

See also
 List of earthquakes in Portugal

References

Further reading

Earthquakes in Portugal
Algarve
1722 earthquakes
18th-century disasters in Portugal
1722 in Europe
1722 disasters in Europe